Speeton railway station served the villages of Speeton and Reighton in North Yorkshire, England. It was situated on the Yorkshire Coast Line from Scarborough to Hull and was opened on 20 October 1847 by the York and North Midland Railway. It closed on 5 January 1970. The station building and the adjacent platform are still in place.

References

External links
 Speeton station on navigable 1947 O. S. map

Disused railway stations in the Borough of Scarborough
Railway stations in Great Britain opened in 1847
Railway stations in Great Britain closed in 1970
Stations on the Hull to Scarborough line
1847 establishments in England
Former York and North Midland Railway stations
George Townsend Andrews railway stations
Beeching closures in England